Little Things is an Indian romantic comedy streaming television series, created by Dhruv Sehgal, who also starred in the lead role along with Mithila Palkar. The series were directed by Ajay Bhuyan and Ruchir Arun and produced by Aditi Shrivastava, Anirudh Pandita and Ashwin Suresh of Dice Media. Its first season was premiered through the official YouTube channel of Dice Media, from 25 October 2016, to 22 November. Netflix later purchased the franchise and its second season and third, was premiered on 5 October 2018 and 9 November 2019. Its fourth and the final season was released on 15 October 2021.

Premise
The story revolves around Kavya Kulkarni (Palkar) and Dhruv Vats (Sehgal), a couple in a live-in relationship in Mumbai. The series progresses with everyday life explored through conversation between the couple. The language used is English, with a few sentences in Hindi (used mostly in slang).

Cast

Main 
 Mithila Palkar as Kavya Kulkarni
 Dhruv Sehgal as Dhruv Vats

Recurring 
 Abhishek Bhalerao as Murthy
Navni Parihar as Ila Kulkarni, Kavya's mother
Rishi Deshpande as Satish Kulkarni, Kavya's father
Asheesh Kapur (Season 2 & 3)
Vikram Kochhar as Dhruv's friend (Season 2 & 3)
Lovleen Mishra as Dhruv's mother (Season 3)
Aman Bhagat as Karan (Season 1)
Veer Rajwant Singh as Akash (Season 1)
Palvi Jaiswal as Sana (Season 1)
Sanjay Gurbaxani as Kavya's boss (Season 1)
Bharat Pahuja as visitor (Season 1)
Paresh Pahuja as Raunak (Season 2)
Kanak Raju as coaching teacher (Season 2)
Priyanka Arya as Sushmita (Season 3)
Ashish Bhatia as Amey (Season 3)
Chandrakant as old watchman (Season 3)
Shikha Chowdary as Anmol (Season 3)
Dhruvin Doshi as Suraj (Season 3)
Sainika Ghaises as Nupur (Season 3)
Martin Jishil as Sandeep (Season 3)
Aakash Khemchandani as Piyush (Season 3)
Hitesh Shejpai as Shenoy (Season 3)
Sarla Shah as Mrs. D'Mello (Season 3)
Vivaan Shah (Season 3)
Abhay verma (Season 3)
Ayush Sehgal as Omkar (Season 4)
Tamara as Ishu (Season 4)
Shiv Tandon as Sanket Lalwani (Season 3 & 4)
Eisha Chopra as Nandini (Season 2 & 4)

Episodes

Season 1 (2016)

Season 2 (2018)

Season 3 (2019)

Season 4 (2021)

Production
Dhruv Sehgal, started writing for the new series in late 2015, featuring Mithila Palkar who have previously acted in short videos by Dice Media and Filter Copy, and have known each other since Palkar's time working at Thespo (Quasar Theatre Productions' annual theatre festival). Sehgal had asked her to audition for Filter Copy's new satire show on YouTube called News Darshan. The series' first season was directed by Ajay Bhuyan and had an episode runtime of 15 minutes each. The series is produced by Aditi Shrivastava, Anirudh Pandita and Ashwin Suresh. The second and third season was directed by Ruchir Arun, who is a National Award winner.

Themes 
The series explores multiple themes, related to everyday life and the problems and challenges faced in it. Season 1 explored themes like a fear of missing out (FOMO) caused by social media and late-night cravings for food. Season 2 explored more serious themes like personal and professional crises. Dhruv is seen reconnecting with an old friend and realising that they have grown apart. He is later seen quitting his job due to a loss of interest. Dhruv is then seen as being "aimless" while Kavya has received a promotion and a pay hike, which leads to fights as they realise the differences between them. Other themes explored in the second season include Kavya getting attracted to a biker on an office trip, homophobia and the possibility of considering one's parents as friends.

Season 3 further explores Dhruv and Kavya's relationship (which had hit a rough patch at the end of Season 2) with them venturing into a long-distance relationship. They thus begin to face loneliness (due to staying apart from one another) and learn to deal with it. They eventually realize that they can also be happy with other people. The two of them also have additional responsibilities and pity themselves. They reconnect with childhood friends and Kavya faces the fear of losing a loved one, her neighbour's dog, Kaju. They both discuss the possibility of marriage and their views on the topic are explored through an episode consisting of flashbacks. While visiting their parents, they realize that they are growing old. Additionally, the season explores the social structures of the big cities, commenting on how the urbanisation results in a loss of humanity.

Soundtrack 
The music and background score is composed by Neel Adhikari, and the series features a theme song composed by Prateek Kuhad specially for it.

Season 1

 "Song for Survival" - Neel Adhikari, Mithila Palkar
 "Food for Thought" - Neel Adhikari
 "Hot or Cold Down There" - Neel Adhikari
 "Luca's Lullaby" - Neel Adhikari
 "Mountaintop Two" - Neel Adhikari
 "Pots N' Pans" - Neel Adhikari, Clovis Soo
 "RocknRolla" - Neel Adhikari

Season 2

 "Musalsal" - Neel Adhikari
 "I Forgive You" - Neel Adhikari
 "Surprise" - Neel Adhikari
 "Okay" - Neel Adhikari
 "Parchai" - Neel Adhikari

Release 
The first season of the series was premiered through Dice Media's YouTube channel, from 25 October 2016 to 22 November 2016. It became a thundering success, with the first episode, which premiered on 25 October, gained over 15 million views, upon its initial release. Later, Netflix collaborated with Dice Media, to acquire the rights for the second season, which was released on 5 October 2018. Netflix announced that the show would be renewed for a third season, with a release date of 9 November 2019.

Reception
Rohan Naahar of Hindustan Times gave it a rating of 4/5 and went on to write "[The show] relies more heavily on performances than most others". Soumya Rao, writing for Scroll.in, called the show "frequently charming, often relatable and never boring". Prakhya Nair of The Red Sparrow rated it 3.5 stars and recommended it to "anyone who wants to delve in a real relationship for a while". Anvita Singh, writing for The Indian Express, opines that "[The show] would have worked better if it had four episodes of 15 minutes each, instead of the eight episodes, each over 22 minutes long" and also critiqued that the second season lacked the show's "sweet-natured relatability".

Other media 
Season 1 of the series was published as a book by Penguin Random House in August 2017. A 20-episode prequel audio series Little Things: Jab Dhruv Met Kavya narrated by Sehgal and Palkar was released on Audible in September 2022.

Awards

References

External links
 

2016 Indian television series debuts
English-language Netflix original programming
Indian drama television series
Television shows set in Mumbai
Indian television series distributed by Netflix